Ayala & Co. is a Champagne producer based in the Aÿ region of Champagne. The house, founded in 1860, produces both vintage and non-vintage cuvee. It is currently being managed by Hadrien Mouflard, former secretary general of Champagne Bollinger. The chef de cave is Caroline Latrive.  The house was one of the founding members of the Syndicat des Grandes Marques in 1882.

History 
In 1855, Edmond de Ayala, the son of a Colombian diplomat, went to visit the Viscount of Mareuil in order to learn how to vinify wine. There he met Gabrielle d'Albrecht, the Viscount's niece. They married in 1858 and Gabrielle brought the Château d'Aÿ and magnificent vines as her dowry. This is how the House was later founded in 1860.

See also
 List of Champagne houses

References

Champagne producers